Paul Schilling is a retired American ice hockey player and coach who led Brown for four seasons in the mid-1970s. He replaced Richard Toomey who was a teammate of his on the US National Team in 1971.

Head coaching record

References

External links

American ice hockey coaches
American men's ice hockey forwards
Army Black Knights men's ice hockey players
Boston College Eagles men's ice hockey players
Brown Bears men's ice hockey coaches
Ice hockey coaches from New York (state)
Living people
People from Clinton, Oneida County, New York
Year of birth missing (living people)
Ice hockey players from New York (state)